La Belle Époque is a 2019 French romantic comedy-drama film written and directed by Nicolas Bedos.

The film stars Daniel Auteuil as Victor, a man in his 60s whose long marriage to Marianne (Fanny Ardant) is on the rocks. When Victor meets Antoine (Guillaume Canet), the owner of a company which allows people to perform a version of "time travel" by visiting a stage where the company acts out a staged historical reenactment, he takes the opportunity to revisit the moment when he first met Marianne, in hopes of rekindling his love for her.

The film premiered out of competition at the 2019 Cannes Film Festival.

Plot
A former draftsman, Victor is now disillusioned. His marriage to Marianne is floundering and he is disinterested and overwhelmed by this overly technological modern world. To cheer him up, his son Maxime pays him for an evening organized by his friend Antoine's company Les Voyageurs du temps. This company offers its customers the opportunity to relive the era of their choice, by mixing theatrical artifices and historical reconstruction. Some wealthy clients choose to spend an evening with William Faulkner, Adolf Hitler or with 17th century aristocrats. At first reluctant, Victor accepts when Marianne throws him out. He then opted to dive back into the most significant week of his life, the one where he met his great love, on May 16, 1974, in the La Belle Époque café in Lyon. In this "staging", Marianne is played by Margot, an actress who lives a complicated and tumultuous relationship with Antoine. The latter, a former screenwriter, is very picky and does not support any approximation on the part of his collaborators. Gradually, Victor will lend himself to the game, until he loses himself in these “reconstituted” memories.

Cast
 Daniel Auteuil as Victor Drumond
 Guillaume Canet as Antoine
 Doria Tillier as Margot
 Fanny Ardant as Marianne Drumond
 Pierre Arditi as Pierre
 Denis Podalydès as François
 Michaël Cohen as Maxime Drumond
 Jeanne Arènes as Amélie
 Bertrand Poncet as Adrien
 Bruno Raffaelli as Maurice/Yvon/Hemingway
 Lizzie Brocheré as Gisèle / Margot’s friend
 Thomas Scimeca as Freddy/Hans Axel von Fersen

Reception
On Metacritic, the film has a weighted average score of 75 out of 100, based on 4 critics, indicating "generally favourable reviews".

Peter Debruge of Variety wrote: "Where so many high-concept romantic comedies squander their one big idea, 'La Belle Époque' leverages its own to remind us how and why we fall in love in the first place..." and Debruge praises the writing, saying it has "a script that's as ambitiously imagined as a Charlie Kaufman movie." Todd McCarthy of The Hollywood Reporter gave the film a positive review calling it a "witty, sexy and original romantic comedy that touches many points of satisfaction."

References

External links
 

2019 films
2019 romantic comedy-drama films
2010s French films
2010s French-language films
Films directed by Nicolas Bedos
Films set in Lyon
Films shot in Paris
French romantic comedy-drama films
Pathé films